Tinashe Nenhunzi (born 21 October 1999) is a Zimbabwean cricketer. He made his first-class debut on 27 December 2019, for Mashonaland Eagles in the 2019–20 Logan Cup. Prior to his first-class debut, he was named in Zimbabwe's squad for the 2018 Under-19 Cricket World Cup. In December 2020, he was selected to play for the Eagles in the 2020–21 Logan Cup. He made his Twenty20 debut on 10 April 2021, for Eagles, in the 2020–21 Zimbabwe Domestic Twenty20 Competition. He made his List A debut on 18 April 2021, for Eagles, in the 2020–21 Pro50 Championship.

References

External links
 

1999 births
Living people
Zimbabwean cricketers
Mashonaland Eagles cricketers
Place of birth missing (living people)